San Diego Independent School District is a public school district based in San Diego, Texas (USA).

Located in Duval County, a small portion of the district extends into Jim Wells County. The portion in Jim Wells County includes the western part of Loma Linda East.

In 2009, the school district was rated "academically acceptable" by the Texas Education Agency.

Schools
San Diego High School (Grades 9-12)
Bernarda Jaime Junior High School (Grades 6-8)
Archie Parr Elementary School (Grades 3-5) (CLOSED)
Anna Norman Collins Primary School (Grades PK-2) (CLOSED)
Now formally merged - Collins Parr Elementary School (Grades PK-5)

References

External links
 

School districts in Duval County, Texas
School districts in Jim Wells County, Texas